The 2009–10 Ohio State Buckeyes men's basketball team represented Ohio State University in the 2009–10 college basketball season. Their head coach was Thad Matta, in his 6th season with the Buckeyes. The team played its home games at the Jerome Schottenstein Center in Columbus, Ohio, and is a member of the Big Ten Conference.

On March 14, 2010, the Ohio State Buckeyes won the Big Ten tournament for the first time since 2007, defeating the Minnesota Golden Gophers 90–61.  The Buckeyes now have three Big Ten tournament Championships (2002, 2007, 2010), the most of any team in the Big Ten.  The Buckeyes also made the 2010 NCAA Division I men's basketball tournament, making it for the second consecutive year and four out of the six years Thad Matta has been head coach. They were a 2 seed in the Midwest Region. Ohio State ended the 2009–10 season with a loss to 6 seed and AP #15 Tennessee Volunteers in the Sweet Sixteen. Their final record was 29–8.

Roster

Source

2010 Recruiting Class

2009–10 Schedule

|-
!colspan=9| Regular Season

|-

|-

|-

|-

|-

|-

|-

|-

|-

|-

|-

|-

|-

|-

|-

|-

|-

|-

|-

|-

|-

|-

|-

|-

|-

|-

|-

|-

|-

|-

|-
!colspan=9| Big Ten tournament

|-
!colspan=9| NCAA tournament

|-

Game Notes – NCAA Tournament

First Round: UC Santa Barbara

The Buckeyes began the 2010 NCAA Tournament with a first round win over UC Santa Barbara in Milwaukee, Wisconsin.  The game went back and forth in the early minutes of the first half with Ohio State taking control late.  UCSB later came back never being put away by Ohio State, coming within 10 points halfway through the second half.  However, Ohio State kept their lead and pulled out a 68–51 win despite Player of the Year nominee Evan Turner only making 2/13 field goals.

Second Round: Georgia Tech

After a commanding win over UCSB in the first round, the Ohio State Buckeyes took on the Georgia Tech Yellow Jackets in the second round for a trip to St. Louis and the sweet sixteen.  After Georgia Tech started off the game on a 10–2 run, the Buckeyes came back and made a game of it.  At the half Ohio State led 28–26 over the Yellow Jackets.  The Buckeyes came out shooting after halftime with their biggest lead coming a 14 points.  However, Georgia Tech came back in the final three minutes and cut it to a four-point game.  With a couple made free-throws and great defensive plays, the Buckeyes punched their ticket to the Sweet Sixteen against Tennessee in St. Louis.

Sweet Sixteen: Tennessee

The Ohio State Buckeyes made their way to the Sweet Sixteen for the first time since 2007 with a matchup against the Tennessee Volunteers.  Ohio State jumped out to an early lead in the game with the score going back and forth throughout the first half.  By halftime, the Buckeyes had a 42–39 lead, and kept it in the early parts of the second half.  However, towards the end of the second half, Tennessee jumped out to a five-point lead which was eventually tied.  Turner and the Buckeyes could not get a game winning shot at the end and lost to Tennessee 76–73.

Rankings

See also
2010 NCAA Division I men's basketball tournament
2009-10 NCAA Division I men's basketball season
List of NCAA Division I institutions
2009–10 Ohio State Buckeyes women's basketball team

External links

Ohio State Buckeyes basketball

Ohio State Buckeyes men's basketball seasons
Ohio State State Buckeyes
Ohio State
Ohio State Buckeyes
Ohio State Buckeyes
Big Ten men's basketball tournament championship seasons